Siphonandrium is a genus of flowering plants belonging to the family Rubiaceae.

Its native range is New Guinea.

Species
Species:
 Siphonandrium intricatum K.Schum.

References

Rubiaceae
Rubiaceae genera